This is a visual history of the Loop (CTA), the  long circuit of elevated railroad that forms the hub of the Chicago "L" system in Chicago, Illinois.

References

Chicago Transit Authority